Grundulus is a genus of characins found in Colombia and Ecuador in South America.  There are currently three described species.

Species
 Grundulus bogotensis (Humboldt, 1821)
 Grundulus cochae Román-Valencia, Paepke & Pantoja, 2003
 Grundulus quitoensis Román-Valencia, Ruiz-Calderón & Barriga, 2005

References
 

Characidae
Fish of South America